Hubert Smith may refer to:
Hubie Smith, basketball coach in Tennessee.
Hubert Smith (cricketer), Australian cricketer
Hubert Llewellyn Smith, British civil servant
Hubert Smith, musician in Bermuda
Hubert Smith, character in The Black Cat (1941 film)
J. Hubert Smith, Arizona politician

See also
Hubert Shirley-Smith (1901–1981), British civil engineer

Bert Smith (disambiguation)
Hubert Smithers